David Kaye may refer to:

 David Kaye (voice actor) (born 1964), Canadian-American voice actor
 David A. Kaye, actor who played Jesse Waingrow in the film 3000 Miles to Graceland
 David Kaye (footballer) (born 1959), English footballer
 David Kaye (magician), known professionally as "Silly Billy"
 David Kaye (academic), UN Special Rapporteur on Freedom of Expression and Opinion

See also
 David Kay (1941 – 2022), appointed to look for Iraq's stockpile of weapons of mass destruction following the U.S. invasion